This is a list of known governors of Mauretania Caesariensis. It was one of the imperial provinces, governed by an appointee of the emperor, in this case a member of the equites. Some governors of Mauretania Caesariensis were also assigned to govern the neighboring province of Mauretania Tingitana; their names appear in bold.

Governors of uncertain date
Publius Aelius Classicus (2nd century; procurator Augusti)
Gaius Asprus Sabinianus (reign of Marcus Aurelius)
Titus Flavius Serenus (reign of Alexander Severus?)
Lucius Septimius Petronianus (end II/beginning III century)
Tiberius Claudius Constans (between 201 and 270; procurator Augusti)

See also 
Mauretania Caesariensis

References 

 
 
Mauretania Caesariensis